The Kenyan cricket team toured Sri Lanka from January and February 2002 to play three first-class and three List A matches against Sri Lanka A. Kenya additionally played a two-day tour match against the BCCSL Academy XI which resulted in a draw. The first-class series, dubbed unofficial Test matches, was won by Sri Lanka A 3–nil. The List A series was won by Kenya 2–1.

Squads

Dulip Liyanage was added to the Sri Lankan A squad on 5 February to cover the injured Dinusha Fernando. The following day Pulasthi Gunaratne was also added to squad. For the List A series, Ian Daniel, Michael Vandort, Prabath Nissanka and Ruchira Perera were replaced by Sajeewa Weerakoon and Anushka Polonowita in the Sri Lankan squad.

Tour match

Two-day match: BCCSL Academy XI v Kenya

The only warm-up match for the Kenyans was a two-day match against Board of Control for Cricket in Sri Lanka Academy XI, a development side. Kenya won the toss and sent their opponents into bat. Opening batsman Jehan Mubarak led the way posting 100 before retiring out. Mubarak combined with skipper Anushka Polonowita (52) to score a 126-run third-wicket partnership. The first day ended with Academy on 276/7. The following day, the hosts declared their innings closed on 281/9 with the Kenya's Thomas Odoyo taking 4/54. In reply, Kenya's openers of Kennedy Otieno and Ravindu Shah put together a century partnership before collapsing to be all out for 234 from 65.3 overs. Former Sri Lanka under-19 leg spinner Kaushal Lokuarachchi starred with the ball taking 9/50 from his 24.3 consecutive overs. He was deprived of the final wicket by his spin partner Amila Perera who ran out Martin Suji from short midwicket. Kenya's coach Sandeep Patil stated that it was good practice match on a very good pitch. He noted that his team is predominantly a one-day side and need to learn how to build long innings.

First-class series

1st match

2nd match

3rd match

List A series

1st match

2nd match

3rd match

Notes

References

External links
 Series home at ESPN Cricinfo

2002 in Kenyan cricket
2002 in Sri Lankan cricket
International cricket competitions in 2001–02
2001–02
Sri Lankan cricket seasons from 2000–01